Yuri Andreyevich Kozlov (born 18 July 1998) is a Russian football player.

Club career
He made his debut in the Russian Football National League for FC Zenit-2 Saint Petersburg on 24 November 2018 in a game against FC Avangard Kursk.

References

External links
 
 Profile by Russian Football National League
 

1998 births
People from Ishimbay
Living people
Russian footballers
Association football forwards
FC Zenit-2 Saint Petersburg players
FC Avangard Kursk players
Sportspeople from Bashkortostan